Hector McNeil (8 November 1901 – 15 July 1969) was an Australian rules footballer who played with Fitzroy in the Victorian Football League (VFL).

Notes

External links 
		

1901 births
1969 deaths
Australian rules footballers from Victoria (Australia)
Fitzroy Football Club players